The Children's Crusade was a crusade to convert Muslims in the Holy Land in the year 1212.

Children's Crusade may also refer to:

History
Children's Crusade (1903), a march led by Mother Jones in 1903
Children's Crusade (1944), the latter half of the Lapland War, a sub-theater of World War II
Children's Crusade (1963), a march led by James Bevel in 1963, during the American Civil Rights Movement

Literature
"The Children's Crusade" (comics), a 1993–1994 story arc in DC Comics' Vertigo imprint
Slaughterhouse-Five, or The Children's Crusade: A Duty-Dance with Death, a 1969 novel by Kurt Vonnegut
Avengers: The Children's Crusade, a 2010 storyline in Marvel Comics' Young Avengers
The Children's Crusade, a short story in Michael Cunningham's Specimen Days
The Children's Crusade, a short novel by Rebecca Brown

Music
 Children's Crusade (Britten), a 1969 composition by Benjamin Britten
 "Children's Crusade", a song by Sting from The Dream of the Blue Turtles

See also
 Innocents Shōnen Jūjigun, a 2007 manga by Usamaru Furuya
 Pentagon Pedophile Task Force, a group promoting conspiracy theories about child trafficking and abuse in the U.S. (their 2019 conference was called the "Children's Crusade")